MCB Madagascar is a commercial bank in Madagascar. It is a member of the Mauritius Commercial Bank Group of companies headquartered in Port Louis, Mauritius. It was formerly known as MCB Madagascar.

History
The bank was established in 1992 by two banking entities, Mauritius Commercial Bank Ltd and Standard Bank, in the name of Union Commercial Bank. The bank is a fully licensed commercial bank in Madagascar, which by 2007 had established branches in Antananarivo (Antsahavola, Ankonrondrano, Ankadimbahoaka, Ambohibao), Taomasina, and Mahajanga. In 2007, the bank changed its name to Mauritius Commercial Bank (Madagascar) SA.

Ownership
The original shareholders were Mauritius Commercial Bank (70%), Standard Bank South Africa (10%), BFCOI (10%), FIARO (5%) and Société Manofi (5%). See table below: Currently, the shareholding may differ from the original ratios in 1992.

See also
 Mauritius Commercial Bank Ltd
 MCB Group

References

External links
 History of MCB Madagascar as Union Commercial Bank
 MCB Madagascar Homepage (French)

Banks of Madagascar
Companies based in Antananarivo
Banks established in 1992
Economy of Madagascar